Summer Soft is an album by American trumpeter Blue Mitchell recorded in 1977 and released on the Impulse! label in 1978.

Reception
In a two-starred review for Allmusic, Scott Yanow said "Although there are some fine players on this LP they are largely wasted on inferior material and commercial arrangements".

Track listing
 "Try Not to Forget" (Cedar Walton) – 7:20
 "Summer Soft" (Stevie Wonder) – 5:55
 " A Day at the Mint" (Blue Mitchell) – 6:15
 "Love Has Made Me a Dreamer"  (Mike Dosco, Esmond Edwards) – 4:50
 "Evergreen" (Barbra Streisand, Paul Williams) – 4:37
 "30 Degrees to the Wind" (Cedar Walton, Susan Brickell) – 5:53
 "Funkthesizer" (Eddie Harris) – 5:33
Recorded in Los Angeles, California in 1977.

Personnel
Blue Mitchell – trumpet (tracks 1 & 3–7), flugelhorn (track 2), vocals (track 7)
Eddie Harris (track 7), Harold Land (tracks 1, 2 & 6), Herman Riley (track 3) – tenor saxophone
Cedar Walton – piano (tracks 1, 2 & 6), electric piano (track 3)
Bobby Lyle – electric piano (track 2), piano (tracks 5 & 7)
Richard Tee – keyboard (track 4)
Michael Boddicker – synthesizer (tracks 1, 2, 5 & 6)
Mike Dosco, Lee Ritenour (track 4) – guitar
Scott Edwards – bass
James Gadson – drums
Paulinho Da Costa – percussion
Julia Tillman Waters, Luther Waters, Maxine Willard Waters, Oren Waters – vocals (tracks  2, 4, 6 & 7)

References

1978 albums
Albums produced by Esmond Edwards
Blue Mitchell albums
Impulse! Records albums